The Executive Council of Alberta (the Cabinet) is a body of ministers of the Crown in right of Alberta, who along with the lieutenant governor, exercises the powers of the Government of Alberta. Ministers are selected by the premier and typically (but not always) sit as a member of the Legislative Assembly (MLA). It is the provincial equivalent to the federal Cabinet of Canada.

Honourifics
Executive councillors are styled "the Honourable". A change was made to the protocol in 2022 and former members who were living on February 6, 2022 (the Platinum Jubilee of Elizabeth II) are now honorary members of the council and are styled "the Honourable" for life (unless removed from membership for an indictable offence). Members and honorary members use the post-nominal letters "ECA".

Role

The executive powers in the province lie with the lieutenant governor and are exercised on the advice of the premier of Alberta and Executive Council of Alberta. The lieutenant governor is restricted by custom and constitutional convention and today, the role as evolved into a figurehead. The current premier is Danielle Smith, who was sworn in as the 19th premier on October 11, 2022.

Membership

The Executive Council of Alberta is similar in structure and role to the Cabinet of Canada. As federal and provincial responsibilities differ there are a number of different portfolios between the federal and provincial governments.

The lieutenant Governor, as representative of the King of Canada, heads the council, and is referred to as the Governor-in-Council. Other members of the Cabinet, who advise, or minister to, the vice-regal representative, are selected by the premier and appointed by the lieutenant governor. Most cabinet ministers are the head of a ministry, but this is not always the case. In the construct of constitutional monarchy and responsible government, the ministerial advice tendered is typically binding (although the royal prerogative belongs to the Crown, not to any of the ministers) and ministers account to the legislature for their portfolios.

Current executive council

The current cabinet has been in place since October 21, 2022.

Former Cabinets
Klein Ministry (1992–2006)
Stelmach Ministry (2006–2011)
Redford Ministry (2011–2014)
Hancock Ministry (2014–2014)
Prentice Ministry (2014–2015)
Notley Ministry (2015–2019)
Kenney Ministry (2019–2022)

See also

 List of premiers of Alberta
 List of Alberta general elections
 Politics of Canada
 Council of the Federation
 List of Alberta provincial ministers

References

Notes

Further reading

External links
Government of Alberta
Government of Alberta Cabinet
Lieutenant Governor of Alberta